The Zanfretta UFO incident was an alleged alien encounter of Italian nightwatchman Pier Fortunato Zanfretta. He later claimed to have been abducted by the beings 11 times between 1978 and 1981.

Initial encounter

At this point, he called his supervisor, who recalled him screaming. The creatures had yellow triangular eyes, and clawed feet.

When the supervisor asked if he was being attacked by men, Zanfretta was said to have responded "No, non sono uomini, non sono uomini..." (No, they are not men), at which point communication was lost.

Zanfretta was later found unconscious and in "a state of shock" by his colleagues.

Later, when under hypnosis, Zanfretta would claim that the beings had abducted him and taken him into a bright room in their craft. He also added to the description of the alien beings saying:

Aftermath

The incident became famous after Zanfretta was invited onto the show Portobello to tell his story.

An investigation was launched by the Carabinieri, who were able to find 52 witnesses who also claimed to have seen the UFO.

In popular culture

The case was the subject of the play "Loro– Storia vera del più famoso rapimento alieno in Italia" (The True Story of the Most Famous Alien Abduction in Italy).

References

Alien abduction reports
1978 in Italy
UFO sightings